Kaliri may refer to:
 Kaliri, Iranshahr
 Kaliri, Konarak